Saulius Mikalajūnas (born 6 September 1972) is a retired Lithuanian international football midfielder. He obtained a total number of 42 caps for the Lithuania national football team, scoring one goal. He also played in Russia during his professional career.

Honours
 Baltic Cup: 1994
 A Lyga Champion: 1997, 1998

References

 

1972 births
Living people
Soviet footballers
Lithuanian footballers
Lithuania international footballers
FK Sirijus Klaipėda players
A Lyga players
FK Atlantas players
FC Rubin Kazan players
FC Elista players
FC Moscow players
Lithuanian expatriate footballers
FC Metallurg Lipetsk players
Expatriate footballers in Russia
Russian Premier League players
FK Kareda Kaunas players
Lithuanian football managers
FK Atlantas managers
Association football midfielders